The Licking River is a tributary of the Muskingum River, about 40 mi (65 km) long, in central Ohio in the United States.  Via the Muskingum and Ohio Rivers, it is part of the watershed of the Mississippi River.

Course
The Licking River is formed at Newark in Licking County by the confluence of its north and south forks including many other small fishable streams.
 The North Fork Licking River, about 35 mi (55 km) long, rises in southwestern Morrow County and initially flows generally east-southeastwardly through Knox County, past Centerburg, into Licking County, where at Utica it turns southwardly and flows past St. Louisville.  In Licking County, the North Fork collects the Otter Fork Licking River, which rises in Knox County and flows past Hartford; the Lake Fork Licking River; and the Clear Fork Licking River.  The Lake and Clear forks both flow for their entire lengths in Licking County.
 The South Fork Licking River, about 30 mi (50 km) long, rises in southwestern Licking County and initially flows southeastwardly past Pataskala and Kirkersville and briefly enters Fairfield County, where it turns northeastwardly back into Licking County and flows past Heath.
From Newark, the Licking River flows generally eastwardly through the Black Hand Gorge State Nature Preserve into Muskingum County, where it turns southeastwardly.  It joins the Muskingum River at Zanesville; the confluence of the two rivers is spanned by a Y-shaped bridge.

Upstream of Zanesville, a U.S. Army Corps of Engineers dam causes the river to form Dillon Lake, along which Dillon State Park is located.

Flow rate

Johnny Appleseed

Jonathan Chapman (1775-1843), aka Johnny Appleseed, planted his first apple orchard near Licking Creek. He took a load of apple seed from Pennsylvania cider presses into the Territory of Ohio in 1801, according to a Harper magazine article written in November 1871, "Johnny Appleseed - A Pioneer Hero" by W.D. Haley (pp. 830–836).

Variant names
According to the Geographic Names Information System, the Licking River has also been known as:
 Licking Creek
 Nepepenime Sepe
 Pataskala Creek
 Pataskala River
 Salt Lick Creek

See also
List of rivers of Ohio

References

 Columbia Gazetteer of North America entry for Licking River
 DeLorme (1991).  Ohio Atlas & Gazetteer.  Yarmouth, Maine: DeLorme.  .

External links
 Blackhand Gorge State Nature Preserve website
 U.S. Army Corps of Engineers website for Dillon Lake
 Dillon State Park website

Rivers of Ohio
Muskingum River
Rivers of Fairfield County, Ohio
Rivers of Knox County, Ohio
Rivers of Licking County, Ohio
Rivers of Morrow County, Ohio
Rivers of Muskingum County, Ohio